Lester Martínez López (born 1955) is an American government official and former Army general who serves as the Assistant Secretary of Defense for Health Affairs since 2023. While in the United States Army, Martínez López was the first Hispanic to head the Army Medical and Research Command at Fort Detrick, Maryland. His responsibilities included overseeing the Army Medical Research Institute of Infectious Disease, which develops antidotes and vaccines for diseases soldiers might face on the battlefield.

Early years
Martínez López was born in the city of Mayagüez, located on the western coast of Puerto Rico, but was raised and educated in the town of Maricao. In 1978, he graduated from the School of Medicine in the University of Puerto Rico.

Military career
In 1978, Martínez López joined the United States Army and was sent to Fort Bragg in North Carolina, where he received his specialty training in family practice and commissioned a Captain upon the completion of his training. He was part of a multinational force in the Sinai following the 1982 Camp David Agreement. In 1983, he completed his MPH (Master of Public Health) degree at the Johns Hopkins Bloomberg School of Public Health with a focus in environmental health sciences. In 1995, Martínez López served as chief medical officer when U.S. forces were sent to Haiti, and three years later, in 1998, he oversaw military relief operations for 8,500 victims of Hurricane Mitch in Central America.

U.S. Army Medical Research and Materiel Command
On March 22, 2002, Martínez López assumed the command of the U.S. Army Medical Research and Materiel Command. The command's research includes vaccines for dengue fever, anthrax and hepatitis; anti-virals for smallpox and countermeasures for environmental, biological and chemical hazards.

As commander of USAMRMC, Martínez López managed more than 4,600 civilian, military and contract facilities at the Army's six medical research laboratories across the country, which include the U.S. Army Medical Research Institute of Infectious Diseases, the Walter Reed Army Institute of Research, the U.S. Army Medical Research Institute of Chemical Defense, the U.S. Army Aeromedical Research Laboratory, the U.S. Army Institute of Surgical Research and the U.S. Army Research Institute of Environmental Medicine. Also under his command were more than half a dozen support centers through contracting, medical logistics management, health care facility planning and information technology management, included the Telemedicine and Advanced Technology Research Center (TATRC), the U.S. Army Medical Research Acquisition Activity and the U.S. Army Medical Materiel Agency.

USAMRMC Accomplishments
Among the major accomplishments of the USAMRMC while under his command are the following:

 The establishment of the Biodefense campus [the National Interagency Biodefense Campus] projects. The project provided all the drugs and equipment for the medics worldwide.
The USAMRMC became the information management for the Army Medical Department. USAMRMC became one of the leaders in the country, if not the world, in telemedicine.

Martínez López wrote the keynote for "Biomaterials for Military Medical Needs. On May 19, 2004, Martínez López was the recipient of the 2004 "Woodrow Wilson Award for Distinguished Government Service" from the Johns Hopkins University Alumni Association at the Johns Hopkins Bloomberg School of Public Health. At the Delta Omega Honor Society induction ceremony, he was the keynote speaker. Martínez López has been featured on the cover of "U.S. Medicine" magazine and on the cover of the December 26, 2002 issue of "Military Medical Technology" magazine.

Career after the U.S. Army
Martínez López retired from the U.S. Army in 2005 and was named the Senior Vice President & Administrator of Lyndon B. Johnson General Hospital Harris County Hospital District in Houston, Texas. He also served as the Chief Medical Officer at the Brandon Regional Hospital in Brandon, Florida. Martínez López belongs to various professional organizations, among them the American Board of Family Medicine and the American Board of Preventive Medicine. He is also a fellow of the American Academy of Family Physicians.

Nomination for Assistant Secretary of Defense for Health Affairs
On November 17, 2021, the White House announced that President Biden intends to nominate Lester Martínez López for the position of Assistant Secretary of Defense for Health Affairs. On January 10, 2022, the White House submitted the nomination to the U.S. Senate, where it was referred to the Committee on Armed Services. The committee held a hearing on the nomination on February 15, 2022, and favorably reported the nomination to the full Senate on March 8, 2022.

Military awards and recognitions
Among Major General Martínez López's military awards and recognition's are the following:

|
|Senior Flight Surgeon Badge

Notes

See also

List of Puerto Ricans
List of Puerto Rican military personnel

References

Further reading
"Puertorriquenos Who Served With Guts, Glory, and Honor. Fighting to Defend a Nation Not Completely Their Own"; by : Greg Boudonck; ; 

1955 births
Johns Hopkins Bloomberg School of Public Health alumni
People from Mayagüez, Puerto Rico
Puerto Rican military doctors
Puerto Rican military officers
Puerto Rican Army personnel
Recipients of the Legion of Merit
Recipients of the Meritorious Service Medal (United States)
United States Army generals
Living people